The 2013 Archery World Cup was the 8th edition of the annual international archery circuit, organised by the World Archery Federation. Archers in the recurve and compound disciplines acquired qualifying points based on their performance. The top mixed team and the top seven individual archers over the course of the four stages (with no more than two from one nation) joined the leading non-qualified host nation archer for the finals.

In recurve, South Korea was the most successful nation, with Olympic champion Oh Jin-hyek and Yun Ok-hee winning both the individual and the team competition. The compound competition saw Martin Damsbo and newcomer Alejandra Usquiano win the individual competitions, and hosts France win the mixed team.

Competition rules and scoring
The compound legs consisted of a 50m qualification round of 72 arrows, followed by the compound round at 50m on a 6-zone target face, using cumulative scoring for all individual, team and mixed competitions. The top seven individual performers (with no more than two from each country,) plus one host nation representative if not already qualified, proceeded to the finals; the top mixed team performer proceeded to face the host nation at the finals, which were the same competition format as the legs. The team competition was not competed at the finals.

The recurve legs consisted of a FITA qualification round, followed by a 72m Olympic set system. The top seven individual performers (with no more than two from each country), plus one host nation representative if not already qualified, proceeded to the finals; the top mixed team performer proceeded to face the host nation at the finals, which were the same competition format as the legs. The team competition was not competed at the finals.

The scores awarded in the four stages were as follows:

Individual scoring

Mixed team scoring

Calendar

Results

Recurve

Men's individual

Women's individual

Men's team

Women's team

Mixed team

Compound

Men's individual

Women's individual

Men's team

Women's team

Mixed team

Medals table

Qualification

Recurve

Men's individual

1. Could not qualify as national quota already reached

Women's individual

1. Could not qualify as national quota already reached

Mixed team

Compound

Men's individual

1. Could not qualify as national quota already reached

Women's individual

1. Qualified for final as leading non-qualified archer from host country

Mixed team

Nations ranking

World Cup Final

Recurve

Men's individual

Women's individual

Mixed team

Compound

Men's individual

Women's individual

Mixed team

References

Competition format 
Competition rules 
Final draw and schedule 
Final compound men bracket 
Final recurve men bracket 
Final compound women bracket 
Final recurve women bracket 
Final compound mixed bracket 
Final recurve mixed bracket 

Archery World Cup
World
2013 in Chinese sport
2013 in Turkish sport
2013 in Colombian sport
2013 in Polish sport
2013 in French sport
International archery competitions hosted by China
International archery competitions hosted by Turkey
International archery competitions hosted by Colombia
International archery competitions hosted by France
International archery competitions hosted by Poland
Sports competitions in Shanghai
Sport in Antalya
21st century in Antalya
Sport in Medellín
Sport in Wrocław
Archery